Lyle Kenneth Luttrell (February 22, 1930 – July 11, 1984) was an American professional baseball player during the 1950s. A shortstop, he appeared in 57 games for the Washington Senators of Major League Baseball during the 1956–1957 seasons.

Born in Bloomington, Illinois, Luttrell attended Illinois Wesleyan University before signing with the Washington organization during the  season. He missed 1952–1953 because of military service, but was called to the Majors during his most productive minor league season, when he batted .324 with 149 hits for the 1956 Chattanooga Lookouts of the Double-A Southern Association. In two trials with the Senators, he vied for playing time at shortstop with José Valdivielso, Rocky Bridges and Jerry Snyder among others, collecting 32 hits in 167 at bats, including nine doubles, three triples and two home runs.  He retired after the 1959 minor league season and died in Chattanooga, Tennessee, from a heart attack at the age of 54.

References

External links
Major League statistics, from Baseball Reference

1930 births
1984 deaths
Asheville Tourists players
Baseball players from Illinois
Charlotte Hornets (baseball) players
Chattanooga Lookouts players
Major League Baseball shortstops
Nashville Vols players
Orlando Senators players
Seattle Rainiers players
Sportspeople from Bloomington, Illinois
Washington Senators (1901–1960) players